Elk River Township is a township in Clinton County, Iowa, USA.  As of the 2000 census, its population was 828.

History
The first settlers intended to name their new township Fair Haven Township, because many of them were natives of Fair Haven, Connecticut. It was then decided upon organization of this township to name it from the Elk River (Iowa), where many elk horns were found at the time of settlement.

Geography
According to the USGS, it contains five cemeteries: Andover, Hauntown, Smith, Teeds Grove and Wilson.

The streams of Cook Slough, Dark Chute, Elk River, North Branch Elk River, Schramling Creek and Silver Creek run through this township.

Notes

References
 USGS Geographic Names Information System (GNIS)

External links
 US-Counties.com
 City-Data.com

Townships in Clinton County, Iowa
Townships in Iowa